In mathematics, a Whittaker function is a special solution of Whittaker's equation, a modified form of the confluent hypergeometric equation introduced by  to make the formulas involving the solutions more symmetric. More generally,  introduced Whittaker functions of reductive groups over local fields, where the functions studied by Whittaker are essentially the case where the local field is the real numbers and the group is SL2(R).

Whittaker's equation is

It has a regular singular point at 0 and an irregular singular point at ∞. 
Two solutions are given by the Whittaker functions Mκ,μ(z), Wκ,μ(z), defined in terms of Kummer's confluent hypergeometric functions M and U by

These functions of  play a role in so-called Kummer spaces.

Whittaker functions appear as coefficients of certain representations of the group SL2(R), called Whittaker models.

References

.
.

.
.

Further reading
 
 
 
 
 
 
 
 
 
 
 
 

Special hypergeometric functions
E. T. Whittaker
Special functions